Kala Bhairava Ashtakam is a Sanskrit Ashtakam, written by Adi Sankara. The hymn illustrates the personality  of  Kala Bhairava of Kashi (also known as Bhairava), the God who destroys Time (kala). It consists of eight stanzas, characteristic of an Ashtakam.

Description
Kala Bhairava is described as black, naked body entwined with snakes, fangs, garland of skulls, three eyes, weapons for punishment in four hands, with shining golden bells attached to his waist-belt. His dreadful laughter that shatters the entire creation - that has sprung out from the womb of the Creator, control over ghosts and goblins, The Tāṇḍava dance that is associated with the  annihilation of the world, liberation of Souls from bodies- all pointing out to the fact that he is the God of Death.

Those who study these 8 verses on Kala Bhairava, which are enticing and which are a source of knowledge and liberation, which increase the righteousness of a person and destroy greed, attachment, depression, anger and heat and enable us to move towards the proximity of feet of Shiva (Kala Bhairava) positively.

Summary

The first stanza is a salutations to Sri Kala Bhairava the supreme lord of Kasi. His Lotus feet are served by Indra, The king of the devas and the great one who wears snake as his sacrificial thread (a cord worn by the Dvija's hanging from their left shoulder and goes below the right shoulder) and a moon on his head. He is extremely compassionate and is praised by Sage Narada and other Yogis, who also is a Digambara (remains naked).

The second stanza is a salutations to Sri Kala Bharaiva who is the supreme Lord of the city of Kasi, who has the brilliance of a million suns, who rescues us from the ocean of worldly existence and who is Supreme, Who has a blue throat, who bestows us with worldly prosperities, which we wish for, and who has three eyes, who is death unto  death itself, whose eyes are like a pair of lotus flowers, whose spear supports the three worlds like an axle ( axis) around which they rotate, and who is imperishable.

The third stanza is a salutations to Lord Kala Bhairava the Lord of Kasi, who holds a spear, a noose, a club and punishment in his four hands, whose body is dark, who is the primordial Lord, who is imperishable, who is beyond the diseases of the world, who is the lord with terrific powers and who loves the strange vigorous Tandava Dance. ( the dance made by Lord Siva when he is terribly angry and preparing for destruction of the cities or worlds).

The fourth stanza is Salutations to Kala Bhairava who is the Lord of Kasi, who is the giver of worldly prosperities as well as liberation and who has an auspicious and pleasing form, who is kind and loving to his devotees, who stands firm as the deity of all the lokas (worlds), who wears a belt containing shining golden bells around his waist- that jingle when he walks or dances creating a variety of pleasing sounds.

The fifth stanza is a salutations to Lord Kala Bhairava who is the supreme lord of Kasi, who guards the established institution of the eternal dharma by leading the devotees towards the same, who is the lord that frees us from the fetters of Karma (the results of sins committed by us in our previous births), thereby giving us (great joy of possessing a sinless, free soul), who is embellished with golden coloured serpents entwining his body.

The sixth stanza is a salutations to Kala Bhairava whose charming beautiful pair of feet are decked with sandals are decked with studded gems, who is the eternal, non dual Ishta devata (the God whom we cherish), who destroys the pride of death (manifested as fear within us), and whose large terrible serpentine fangs liberate us.

The seventh stanza is Salutations to Kala Bhairava Whose loud and terrific laughter shatters the offspring  produced by the ovaries of the creator (Lord Brahma), who is the powerful ruler who gives the eight powers( Siddhis), who wears a garland of skulls (like his counterpart Maha Kalika), whose terrific glance destroys the cob-webs, produced in our minds by the mighty rule of Sin.

The final stanza is a Salutation to Kala Bhairava the ruler of Kasi, who is the leader of ghosts and spirits, who showers glory on his devotees, who absolves people dwelling in Kasi from their sins as well as the fruits of their  righteous deeds -  thus making their souls devoid of any connection with the mortal world, who is splendour, who is the lord, efficient in guiding us on the path of righteousness, who is eternally old, and who is the Lord of the universe.

References

External links
 www.stutimandal.com
 www.KnowyourMantras.blog.spot.com/2011/07
 http://www.astrojyoti.com/mp3stotras_full.htm
 https://greenmesg.org/stotras/shiva/kalabhairava_ashtakam.php
 https://www.thedivineindia.com/kalabhairava-ashtakam/6721

Adi Shankara
Sanskrit poetry